Bağanis Ayrum is a ghost village in the Qazakh District of Azerbaijan. The village has been controlled by Armenia since the First Nagorno-Karabakh War.

History 
On 22 March 1990, Azerbaijani farmers shot at passing trucks and cars with Armenian license plates, wounding several people in a Volga Sedan.

In retaliation, four days later, several cars full of Armenians armed with shotguns and assault rifles attacked Baghanis Ayrum before dawn, setting fire to about 20 houses and killing 8 Azerbaijani civilians. The bodies of one family, including an infant, were reportedly found burnt in the embers of their house.

Kommersant reported that as a result of the attack on 26 March 1992, eleven inhabitants of the village died.

References

External links 

Populated places in Qazax District